The acronym DANIPS stands for "Delhi, Andaman and Nicobar Islands, Lakshadweep, Dadra and Nagar Haveli and Daman and Diu Police Service". It is a federal civil service in India, administering National Capital Territory of Delhi and the Union territories of India. It was earlier called the Union Territories Police Service. It is a civil service of the Government of India. Officers of the service are recruited directly through the Civil Services Examination and are responsible for the law & order and policing functions of the National Capital, Delhi and the Union Territories. They form a feeder cadre of the Indian Police Service.

Selection criteria 
DANIPS officers are recruited directly through the rigorous Civil Services Examination conducted by Union Public Service Commission every year. Moreover, the cadre is augmented by promotion of non-gazetted officers to the DANIPS.

The Civil Services Examination has a three-stage competitive selection process. At stage one, there is an objective type examination called the preliminary exam. This is a qualifying examination. It consists of a General Studies paper and an aptitude test. Only the candidates who pass this can appear for the "Main Examination" which consists of seven + two papers (Two papers - English and regional language paper are only qualifying while seven papers carry marks). Each candidate has to select an optional subject (two papers) and to take four General Studies papers, an Essay, an English language paper and a regional language paper. This is followed by an interview.

Two-thirds of the strength is filled directly by DANIPS officers and the remaining are promoted from the non-gazetted police officers of the Union Territories.

Cadre strength
DANIPS officers form the backbone of the largest metropolitan police force in India, the Delhi Police. The cadre has a sanctioned strength of 434. Ministry of Home Affairs, Government of India, is the cadre controlling authority for DANIPS. They are regulated by the Delhi Government on the recommendation of the respective Governor/Administrator/ Lieutenant Governor of that Union Territory.

Pay structure 

After attaining seniority and getting promoted into Senior Grades (JAG-I and JAG-II/SAG) and get inducted into IPS (AGMUT Cadre). Following which IPS service and pay rules apply to them.

Ranks and insignia of DANIPS officers

After a probationary period of two years, DANIPS officers are appointed as Assistant Commissioners of Police in Delhi or as Sub-Divisional Police Officers (SDPO) in Union Territories.

See also

 DANICS
 Indian Police Service
 Indian State Police Services

References

Federal law enforcement agencies of India
Civil Services of India
Police Service
Law enforcement in Delhi
Police Service
Police Service
Police Service
Police Service
Police Service
Police Service
1972 establishments in India